Arndt Kaspar (born 23 August 1962 in Blieskastel) is a German former sport shooter who competed in the 1988 Summer Olympics.

References

1962 births
Living people
German male sport shooters
ISSF pistol shooters
Olympic shooters of West Germany
Shooters at the 1988 Summer Olympics
Sportspeople from Saarland
People from Saarpfalz-Kreis
20th-century German people